Donald Emerson "Don" Taylor (September 22, 1933 – October 7, 2012) was a former political figure in the Yukon, Canada. He represented Watson Lake in the Yukon Territorial Council from 1961 to 1978, and then in the Yukon Legislative Assembly from 1978 to 1985, as a Progressive Conservative then Independent member.

He was born in Toronto, the son of Emerson R. Taylor and Olive Kennedy, and educated in Toronto, Aurora and Lakefield. Johnston served as Speaker of the Yukon Legislative Assembly from 1974 to 1985. Before entering politics, Taylor was employed in mining exploration and aviation.

Taylor was defeated by Dave Porter when he ran for reelection in 1985. He died in 2012 of lung cancer.

References

External links 
 

1933 births
2012 deaths
Members of the Yukon Territorial Council
Politicians from Toronto
Speakers of the Yukon Legislative Assembly
Yukon Party MLAs